David Turnbull may refer to:
David Turnbull (politician) (born 1942), Canadian politician
David Turnbull (abolitionist) (died 1851), British  abolitionist and British consul to Cuba
David Turnbull (materials scientist) (1915–2007), American physical chemist
David Turnbull (priest) (1944–2001), Archdeacon of Carlisle
David Turnbull (footballer) (born 1999), Scottish footballer